Alexey Yevgrafovich Favorsky (– 8 August 1945), was a Russian and Soviet chemist. Hero of Socialist Labour (1945).

Life
Favorsky studied chemistry at the imperial Saint Petersburg State University from 1878 to 1882. He joined Alexander Butlerov's laboratory for several years, and in 1891 became a lecturer. In 1895, Favorksy received his PhD and became professor for technical chemistry. His discovery of the Favorskii rearrangement in 1894 and the Favorskii reaction between 1900 and 1905 are connected to his name. He worked at the new organics department from 1897, and served as its director from 1934 to 1937. For his improvement of the production of synthetic rubber, Favorsky was awarded the Stalin Prize in 1941.

The artist Vladimir Favorsky was his nephew.

Favorsky died in 1945 and was buried at the Volkovskoye Orthodox cemetery.

Further reading
Biography (St. Petersburg Encyclopedia)

(Favorskii's academic lineage)

1860 births
1945 deaths
20th-century chemists
Corresponding Members of the Russian Academy of Sciences (1917–1925)
Full Members of the USSR Academy of Sciences
Saint Petersburg State University alumni
Academic staff of Saint Petersburg State University
Heroes of Socialist Labour
Stalin Prize winners
Recipients of the Order of Lenin
Recipients of the Order of Saint Stanislaus (Russian), 2nd class
Recipients of the Order of St. Anna, 2nd class
Recipients of the Order of St. Vladimir, 4th class
Recipients of the Order of the Red Banner of Labour
Russian chemists
Soviet chemists
Soviet inventors